Bursina ignobilis is a species of sea snail, a marine gastropod mollusk in the family Bursidae, the frog shells.

References

Bursidae
Gastropods described in 1987